Taraiasi Nodrakoro "Puna" Rasaubale (born 21 December 1986) is a Fijian professional boxer and rugby league footballer.

External links
 Profile at BoxRec
 Profile at the 2006 Commonwealth Games

References

1986 births
Living people
London Skolars players
Newcastle Thunder players
Western Suburbs Magpies NSW Cup players
Fijian rugby league players
Fijian male boxers
Fiji national rugby league team players
Rugby league props
Boxers at the 2006 Commonwealth Games
Commonwealth Games competitors for Fiji